European route E411 is a European route in Belgium and France connecting Brussels to Metz via Namur and Arlon. The E411 starts in the municipality of Auderghem alongside the Beaulieu metro station, crosses the municipality on a viaduct, then crosses the Brussels Ring and leaves Auderghem to enter Flanders in Overijse. When it leaves Overijse, the route enters Wallonia in Rixensart. It has an interchange with European route E42 near Namur and with European route E25 near Neufchâteau. At this point and up to Arlon, the two routes use the same road. In Arlon, route E411 continues to Aubange in Belgium, Longwy in France and on to Metz where it connects to the A31-E25 near Uckange.

In Belgium, the route E411 has the national designation A4 and name l'Autoroute des Ardennes and is roughly parallel to the N4 road.

External links 
 UN Economic Commission for Europe: Overall Map of E-road Network (2007)

411
E411